Holy Trinity Church is an Anglican parish church in Leicester, England.

Background

The Victorian building is situated on Regent Road to the south of the city centre, close to the University of Leicester, De Montfort University and the Leicester Royal Infirmary. Holy Trinity is an Evangelical, Charismatic and Anglican church. Elaine Sutherland was appointed as Vicar in March 2020. James Norris and Jitesh Patel are the Associate Vicars, appointed in September 2021 and March 2018 respectively.

History
The Church Building Act of 1818 provided funds for two new Leicester parishes, one of which was Holy Trinity. The church was built in 1838 to Sydney Smirke's classical design as the city expanded, and formed part of a new suburb. The new parish, also established in 1838, was created out of part of the parish of St Mary de Castro Church.

In 1872, Holy Trinity was completely redesigned by Samuel Sanders Teulon in a High Gothic style, with spire and side turrets in red-purple brick with limestone decoration.

During the 19th century the church had wooden pews and a single central aisle, with balconies on both sides of the church; the central aisle was occupied by the middle classes and the balconies by their servants. Access to ground floor was via the main church entrance, with two side entrances for the balconies.

Vicars
William Hill 1838 - 1865
Edmund Davys 1865 - 1876
James Arthur Faithfull 1878 - 1882
Edward Grose-Hodge 1890 - 1894 
W. Jeffry Thompson 1894 - 1906
Frederick Papprill 1905 - 1921
R. Chalmers ca. 1939
John Aldis 1980 - 1989
Roger Morgan 1990 - 2008
John McGinley 2009 - 2019
Elaine Sutherland 2020–Present

Buildings 
A significant building project was carried out in 2018–2019, resulting in a reordered building, including main worship space, and entrance area that incorporates a coffee house. The existing balcony has been extended with new stairs within the Chancel, and the stage area has been reordered.

The chancel end wall has five arched stained glass windows featuring contemporary designs of the Parable of The Sower (see Matthew 12:1-24), above which there is a more traditional floral design including an emblem of the Trinity, with smaller windows featuring "The Truth" and "The Life", but there is not a window depicting "The Way" (see John 14:6). The chancel marble end wall also features a depiction of the Last Supper.

The pipe organ was transferred to a church in Poland in 2020.

The church and nearby buildings are now part of the New Walk conservation area.

Present 
Holy Trinity is a Mission-Shaped church, where church members belong to mid-sized Mission Shaped Communities (MSCs) based around geographical locations, social networks or interests. Holy Trinity states that its vision is to "be a community that glorifies God by transforming Leicester and beyond."

The church community is made up of a range of different ages, including many children and young people and a large population of University Students. Holy Trinity is also connected with the ministry of the Charismatic Evangelical movement New Wine.

The church is actively involved in outreach into the local communities in Leicester including an expanding ministry to the city's Homeless called "Triangle". Holy Trinity runs the Alpha course throughout the year as well as a multimedia and arts table-talk style event called "Questions", pioneered by the previous vicar, Roger Morgan.

The Sunday services follow a theme during each term. The morning services are family-oriented with music by a live band, and the evening tends to attract more students and young adults. At each service the sermon is recorded and later made available as a podcast; sermons can be downloaded individually from the church website in MP3 audio format. Average attendance at the Sunday services totals 500.

Organ

The organ was removed in May 2018. A specification of the pipe organ can be found on the National Pipe Organ Register.

Organists
Edwin John Crow 1861 - 1866 (later organist of Ripon Cathedral)
James M. Morland ca. 1873
Walter James Bunney 1884 - 1905 (afterwards organist of St Peter's Church, Leicester)
Vincent Dearden ???? - 1913
James William Wilson 1913 - ???? (formerly organist of St Matthew's Church, Leicester)
Percy Jones ???? - 1930 
Jack King 1930  - 1932 (formerly organist at St Matthew's Church, Leicester)
Dennis Arnold Smith 1932 - 1938
Alec McGregor 1977 - 1995

References

External links
Official website
Holy Trinity Leicester podcast on iTunes
Leicester City Council Urban Design Group: New Walk Conservation Area
Modern Leicester 

Holy Trinity Church
Churches completed in 1838
19th-century Church of England church buildings
Grade II listed buildings in Leicestershire